Marcus Nathan Bent (born 19 May 1978) is a retired English professional footballer. A former England under-21 international, the journeyman striker played 573 games and scored 113 goals for fourteen different clubs. His numerous transfer fees totalled over £10 million.

He began his career at Brentford in 1995, before he signed with Crystal Palace in 1998, where he made his Premier League debut. The next year he joined Sheffield United via Port Vale. In 2000, he transferred to Blackburn Rovers, before he moved on to Ipswich Town in 2001. He spent 2003–04 on loan at Leicester City, before he transferred to Everton in 2004.

Two years later he was sold on to Charlton Athletic. He spent the 2007–08 season on loan at Wigan Athletic, before he moved on to Birmingham City in 2008. He spent three years with Birmingham, during which he spent time on loan at Middlesbrough, Queens Park Rangers, Wolverhampton Wanderers, and Sheffield United. After leaving the club he spent six months in Indonesia with Mitra Kukar. After five years out of the game, during which time he faced legal issues, he then had brief spells in non-league football with Wick and Cornard United.

Club career

Brentford
Bent graduated through the Brentford youth ranks, usually playing as a forward. He broke into the first team at Griffin Park in 1995–96 under manager David Webb, helping the Bees to a 15th-place finish in the Second Division. Bent was almost ever-present in a successful season that saw Brentford reach the play-offs in 1996–97 with a fourth-place finish. He played at Wembley in the play-off Final defeat to Crewe Alexandra, and was substituted after 70 minutes for Scott Canham. Bent then scored five goals in 29 games in 1997–98, as the Bees struggled in vain to avoid relegation under Eddie May and then his replacement Micky Adams.

Crystal Palace
Though not a prolific striker for Brentford, Bent's potential was spotted by Crystal Palace manager Steve Coppell, who brought Bent to Selhurst Park for £300,000 on 8 January 1998. The Eagles were relegated out of the Premier League in last place in 1997–98, though Bent had shown his ability with five goals in 16 games, including strikes at Stamford Bridge and Anfield. However, he remained goalless in 15 appearances in 1998–99, as Palace struggled under new boss Terry Venables. With the club heading for administration, he was sold on to First Division rivals Port Vale for £300,000 on 15 January 1999, as one of long-term manager John Rudge's last purchases.

Port Vale
Rudge was unable to make the most of his new player, as chairman Bill Bell controversially sacked Rudge and hired Brian Horton. Played out of position on the left-wing, Bent went 15 games without a goal for the Valiants in 1998–99. He played nine games in 1999–2000, scoring once against Grimsby Town in a 3–1 win at Vale Park. In October 1999, he was sold on to league rivals Sheffield United for £375,000, with Bell eager to cash in on the £75,000 profit. He later described moving from Crystal Palace to Port Vale as "my dream blown up in my face" as he struggled to adapt to life outside London, referring to the culture shock he said "Someone said 'All right, Duck', which put me on my toes. I thought, 'Why are you calling me Duck?'

Sheffield United
Bent became the Blades top scorer in 1999–2000 with 15 league goals in 32 appearances, including a hat-trick past West Bromwich Albion in a 6–0 thrashing at Bramall Lane on 19 February. The club had struggled under Adrian Heath, before finding an upturn in results after Neil Warnock stepped into the hot-seat in December. He began the 2000–01 campaign in fine form, hitting a hat-trick past Lincoln City in a 6–1 win in the League Cup. He was reportedly targeted by former club Crystal Palace for a swap deal of Clinton Morrison and £1.5 million; however manager Alan Smith denied that he had made any such offer. He was instead sold to promotion chasing Blackburn Rovers for £2 million in November 2000; the transfer was seen as good business for both clubs.

Blackburn Rovers
Bent scored his first goal for Rovers against bitter East Lancashire rivals Burnley in a 2–0 win at Turf Moor on 17 December 2000. He went on to hit 11 goals in 34 appearances in 2000–01, justifying Graeme Souness's fee, as the Ewood Park club won promotion back to the Premier League. He made ten goalless appearances in 2001–02, before he was sold on to Ipswich Town for £3 million in November 2001, which was Town's fourth biggest transfer fee behind teammates Matteo Sereni, Hermann Hreiðarsson, and Finidi George.

Ipswich Town

Despite Bent scoring nine times in 22 league starts, the Blues were relegated from the Premier League at the end of the 2001–02 season. He stayed at Portman Road for the 2002–03 campaign, hitting 12 goals in 38 games, as the Tractor Boys missed out on the play-offs by one place and four points. However Ipswich entered administration, and were forced to sell talent such as Marcus Stewart, Titus Bramble, and Darren Ambrose; a relegation battle was only avoided after manager George Burley was replaced by Joe Royle. Ipswich then found another striking talent, Darren Bent (no relation), and Bent joined newly promoted Premier League side Leicester City on loan for the 2003–04 campaign, in a move that reunited him with manager Micky Adams. Bent scored ten goals in 35 games, though the First Division beckoned for the Foxes, as the Walkers Stadium outfit finished six points behind 17th place Everton.

Everton
Unable to afford his £17,000-per-week contract, in June 2004, Ipswich sold Bent to Everton for a fee of £450,000; the Toffees manager David Moyes said that "he's got athleticism, he's quick, good in the air". He became a regular starter at Goodison Park in the lone centre forward role (supported by Tim Cahill), but only managed seven goals in 2004–05, which were key in securing draws away to Southampton and at home to Aston Villa, as well as decisive goals against Middlesbrough and Manchester City. Despite having helped the club to secure a place in the Champions League, Bent became a more peripheral figure in 2005–06, having lost his first team place to James Beattie.

Charlton Athletic
In January 2006, it was announced that Bent had signed for Charlton Athletic in a deal worth £2.3 million. He scored on his debut as a substitute against Premier League champions Chelsea in a 1–1 draw. Bent hit only two goals in 35 games in 2006–07, 13 fewer than strike partner Darren Bent, who had signed with Charlton from Ipswich. The club had collapsed following the departure of manager Alan Curbishley after his fifteen-year reign, and First Division football returned to The Valley despite the best efforts of Iain Dowie, Les Reed and Alan Pardew.

Loan to Wigan Athletic
Bent joined Wigan Athletic on Transfer Deadline Day (31 August 2007) on a season-long loan move, one of nine summer signings by boss Chris Hutchings. However, after a poor start to the campaign, Hutchings was replaced by Steve Bruce. Bent scored a hat-trick, his first in the Premier League, against former club Blackburn Rovers in a 5–3 win, on 15 December; Roque Santa Cruz also scored a hat-trick in the game, the first time in the Premier League that two opposing players scored hat-tricks in the same match. Despite only hitting seven goals in 32 games, he still became the Latics's top scorer in 2007–08. At the end of the season, Wigan manager Steve Bruce chose not to make the deal permanent, feeling Bent was too similar in style to Emile Heskey; Bent subsequently returned to cash-strapped Charlton, where he was placed on the transfer list.

Birmingham City
Bent signed a three-year deal for Birmingham City in July 2008 for a fee in excess of £1 million, after rejecting the opportunity to join Cardiff City. He scored three goals from 16 starts and 17 substitute appearances as Alex McLeish got the club promoted to the Premier League with a second-place finish in 2008–09. He did not feature at the higher level for the Blues. Instead, he became Gordon Strachan's first signing for Middlesbrough when he joined on a two-month loan deal on 30 October 2009, later extended to 16 January 2010. He spent the final three months of the 2009–10 season on loan at a second Championship club, Queens Park Rangers, whom he joined in February 2010. Both clubs finished in mid-table, and Bent failed to find the net at either the Riverside Stadium or Loftus Road.

Still out of the first team plans at St Andrew's, he again moved on loan in August 2010, as he joined Mick McCarthy's Premier League side Wolverhampton Wanderers until 4 January 2011. He made five appearances without scoring, before joining Sheffield United on loan until the end of the 2010–11 season, teaming up with Micky Adams at a third different club. With the Blades in free-fall Bent made ten appearances, mainly from the bench, before returning early to Birmingham in mid-April having failed to score a goal. Birmingham decided against taking up the option of another season, and Bent was released when his contract expired at the end of the 2010–11 season.

Mitra Kukar
Bent signed a one-year contract with Indonesia Super League club Mitra Kukar on 3 November 2011. In doing so he rejected interest from clubs in England, choosing the Far East as he "didn't want to be based up north". He was released on 17 April 2012, with the club in mid-table.

Non-league football
On 13 September 2017, now aged 39, Bent signed a one-year contract with Southern Combination League Premier Division club Wick; club chairman Rodney Lampton said he and Bent had been childhood friends. However, Bent left the club without making an appearance. On 3 January 2020, he joined Eastern Counties League First Division North club Cornard United.

International career
Bent represented his England at under-21 level in May 1998, in games against South Africa and Argentina.

Personal life
Bent was born in Hammersmith, London, to parents of Jamaican origin. Prior to signing a scholarship with Brentford in 1994, he was named Marcus Lecky. He has a younger brother, Elliott, who is ten years his junior and is also a footballer. Elliott was a youth team player at Fulham, until injury saw him released in 2007. He dropped into non-league football and has played for Dorchester Town, Welling United and Hampton & Richmond Borough.

Bent had been engaged to Kelly Clark, with whom he has a daughter, but their relationship broke down and they split up. He has since been involved with model Danielle Lloyd and actress Gemma Atkinson, to whom he was briefly engaged. After his playing career ended, Bent entered the oil business. However he left the industry and his life went into a steep decline as he struggled with mental health problems, using drugs to self medicate.

He was charged with affray and possession of a Class A drug in September 2015 after police used a taser whilst arresting him at his home in Esher, Surrey. He had called 999 after believing intruders were in his house, but was tasered by police responding to the call. In February 2016 he admitted to one charge of affray and possession of cocaine; he was given a suspended 12-month prison sentence, a two-month curfew and 200 hours of compulsory unpaid work. Four months later he was fined £385 with £85 costs after being found with cocaine at Chessington World of Adventures. He was declared bankrupt in January 2019.

Career statistics

Honours
Blackburn Rovers
Football League First Division second-place promotion: 2000–01

Birmingham City
Football League Championship second-place promotion: 2008–09

Individual
Premier League Player of the Month: January 2002

References

External links

1978 births
Living people
English people of Jamaican descent
Footballers from Hammersmith
Black British sportsmen
English footballers
Association football forwards
Brentford F.C. players
Crystal Palace F.C. players
Port Vale F.C. players
Sheffield United F.C. players
Blackburn Rovers F.C. players
Ipswich Town F.C. players
Leicester City F.C. players
Everton F.C. players
Charlton Athletic F.C. players
Wigan Athletic F.C. players
Birmingham City F.C. players
Middlesbrough F.C. players
Queens Park Rangers F.C. players
Wolverhampton Wanderers F.C. players
Mitra Kukar players
Wick F.C. players
Cornard United F.C. players
English Football League players
Premier League players
Liga 1 (Indonesia) players
Eastern Counties Football League players
England under-21 international footballers
English expatriate footballers
English expatriate sportspeople in Indonesia
Expatriate footballers in Indonesia